Dainik Prantajyoti is a Bengali daily newspaper published from Silchar, Assam.

References

Bengali-language newspapers published in India
Silchar
Publications with year of establishment missing
Newspapers published in Assam